The Therapeutic Fraud Prevention Act is a bill in the United States House of Representatives that if passed would prohibit, as an unfair and deceptive act or practice, commercial sexual orientation and gender identity conversion therapy, and for other purposes.

Introduced bills

114th Congress
On May 19, 2015, Rep. Ted Lieu (D-CA), who had authored the first such ban in California while State Senator in 2012, introduced the Therapeutic Fraud Prevention Act (H.R. 2450) in the U.S. House of Representatives. The bill had 96 cosponsors.

On April 28, 2016, Sen. Patty Murray (D-WA) introduced a companion bill (S. 2880) in the U.S. Senate, where it had 21 cosponsors.

115th Congress
On April 25, 2017, Rep. Ted Lieu reintroduced the Therapeutic Fraud Prevention Act (H.R. 2119) in the House of Representatives, and Sen. Patty Murray reintroduced it (S. 928) in the Senate. The House bill had 110 cosponsors and the Senate counterpart had 25 cosponsors.

116th Congress
On March 28, 2019, Rep. Sean Patrick Maloney (D-NY) introduced the Prohibition of Medicaid Funding for Conversion Therapy Act (H.R. 1981) in the House of Representatives with 83 cosponsors.

On June 27, 2019, Rep. Ted Lieu reintroduced the Therapeutic Fraud Prevention Act (H.R. 3570) in the House of Representatives, and Sen. Patty Murray reintroduced it (S. 2008) in the Senate. The House bill had 219 cosponsors and the Senate counterpart had 43 cosponsors.

117th Congress
On June 24, 2021, Rep. Ted Lieu reintroduced the Therapeutic Fraud Prevention Act (H.R. 4146) in the House of Representatives, and Sen. Patty Murray reintroduced it (S. 2242) in the Senate. The House bill has 89 cosponsors and the Senate counterpart has 33 cosponsors.

Support
The Human Rights Campaign has endorsed the Therapeutic Fraud Prevention Act.

See also
 List of U.S. jurisdictions banning conversion therapy

References

External links
 H.R. 2450: Therapeutic Fraud Prevention Act on GovTrack

Proposed legislation of the 114th United States Congress
2015 in LGBT history
Anti-discrimination law in the United States
Conversion therapy
LGBT rights in the United States
United States proposed federal labor legislation